Wu Mingyang (born 21 January 1997) is a Chinese sport shooter.

She participated at the 2018 ISSF World Shooting Championships.

References

External links

1997 births
Chinese female sport shooters
Living people
ISSF rifle shooters
Sport shooters from Shandong
Shooters at the 2018 Asian Games
Asian Games competitors for China